Peter (30 August 133423 March 1369), called the Cruel or the Just, was King of Castile and León from 1350 to 1369. Peter was the last ruler of the main branch of the House of Ivrea. He was excommunicated by Pope Urban V for his persecutions and cruelties committed against the clergy.

Early life
Peter was born in the defensive tower of the Monasterio de Santa María la Real de Las Huelgas in Burgos, Spain. His parents were Alfonso XI of Castile and Maria of Portugal.

He was accustomed to long, strenuous hours of work, lisped a little and "loved women greatly". He was well read and a patron of the arts, and in his formative years he enjoyed entertainment, music and poetry.

He was to be married to his contemporary Joan, the second and favourite daughter of King Edward III of England; however, on their way to Castile she and her retinue travelled through cities infested with the Black Death, ignoring townspeople who had warned them not to enter their settlements. Since the plague had not yet entered England, it is likely that they underestimated the danger. Joan soon contracted the disease and died in 1348, aged 14. 

About two years later Peter began his reign when almost sixteen years old and subject to the control of his mother and her favourites. Though at first controlled by his mother, Maria of Portugal, Peter ascended the throne with the encouragement of his mother's second cousin, the Portuguese minister Count Alburquerque. Becoming attached to María de Padilla, he married her in secret in 1353. María turned him against Alburquerque, who fled to Portugal.

In the summer of 1353, the young king was practically coerced by his mother and the nobles into marrying Blanche of Bourbon; he deserted her at once upon hearing rumors that she had slept with his half-brother Fadrique, who was supposed to be guarding her virtue and made her instead "an unwilling Isolde to his Tristan," according to one historian. This marriage necessitated Peter's denying that he had married María, but his relationship with her continued and she bore him four children. He also apparently went through the form of marriage with Juana de Castro, widow of Don Diego de Haro, convincing her that his previous marriage to Queen Blanche was a nullity. The bishops of Avila and Salamanca were asked to concur, and were afraid to say otherwise. Peter and Juana were married in Cuellar, and Juana was proclaimed Queen of Castile. After two nights, he then deserted her. She bore him a son who died young, after Peter's death. A period of turmoil followed in which the king was for a time overpowered and, in effect, imprisoned. The dissension within the party striving to coerce him enabled him to escape from Toro, where he was under observation, to Segovia.

In 1361, Queen Blanche died at Medina Sidonia. French historians claim that Peter ordered two Jews to murder her; another version of the story says she was poisoned; a third one that she was shot with a crossbow, although it may have been the plague. Also that year, Maria de Padilla died in Seville.

Wars with Aragon

From 1356 to 1366, Peter engaged in constant wars with Aragon in the "War of the Two Peters", in which he showed neither ability nor skill in his support of his English ally or Castilian interests in the Mediterranean against the French and Aragonese. The king of Aragon then supported Peter's bastard brothers against him. It was during this period that Peter perpetrated the series of murders which made him notorious.

In 1366 began the calamitous Castilian Civil War, which would see him dethroned. He was assailed by his bastard brother Henry of Trastámara at the head of a host of soldiers of fortune, including Bertrand du Guesclin and Hugh Calveley, and abandoned the kingdom without daring to give battle, after retreating several times (first from Burgos, then from Toledo, and lastly from Seville) in the face of the oncoming armies. Peter fled with his treasury to Portugal, where he was coldly received by his uncle, King Peter I of Portugal, and thence to Galicia, in the northern Iberian Peninsula, where he ordered the murder of Suero, the archbishop of Santiago, and the dean, Peralvarez.

Peter and the Spanish Jewry
Peter's rival Henry of Trastámara continuously depicted Peter as "King of the Jews", and had some success in taking advantage of popular Castilian antisemitism. Henry instigated pogroms beginning a period of anti-Jewish riots and forced conversions in Castile that lasted approximately from 1370 to 1390. Peter took forceful measures against this, including the execution of at least five anti-Jewish leaders of a riot.

The prominence of Samuel ha-Levi, King Peter's treasurer, has often been cited as evidence of Peter's supposed pro-Jewish sentiment, but Ha-Levi's success did not necessarily reflect the general experience of the Spanish Jewry in this period which was often marked by discrimination and pogroms.  Following Peter's death, Jews had to wear a yellow badge, as punishment for having supported him.

Death
 
In the summer of 1366, Peter took refuge with Edward, the Black Prince, who restored him to his throne in the following year after the Battle of Nájera. The health of the Black Prince broke down, and he left the Iberian Peninsula. bringing with him two of Pedro I's daughters, Constance and Isabella of Castile, whom he had taken as hostages as assurers that Pedro would pay up. He married the princesses into English nobility, most famously Constance to his brother John of Gaunt, in order to make a claim on the Castilian throne.

Meanwhile, Henry of Trastámara returned to Castile in September 1368. The cortes of the city of Burgos recognized him as King of Castile. Others followed, including Córdoba, Palencia, Valladolid, and Jaén. Galicia and Asturias, on the other hand, continued to support Peter. As Henry made his way toward Toledo, Peter, who had retreated to Andalusia, chose to confront him in battle. On 14 March 1369, the forces of Peter and Henry met at Montiel, a fortress then controlled by the Order of Santiago. Henry prevailed with the assistance of Bertrand du Guesclin. Peter took refuge in the fortress, which, being controlled by a military order of Galician origin, remained faithful to him. Negotiations were opened between Peter and his besieger, Henry. Peter met with du Guesclin, who was acting as Henry's envoy. Peter offered du Guesclin 200,000 gold coins and several towns, including Soria, Almazán, and Atienza to betray Henry. Ever opportunistic, du Guesclin informed Henry of the offer and immediately bargained for greater compensation from Henry to betray Peter.

Having made a deal with Henry, Du Guesclin returned to Peter. Under the guise of accepting his deal, du Guesclin led Peter to his tent on the night of 23 March 1369. Henry was waiting. The historian López de Ayala described the encounter as follows: "Upon entering du Guesclin's tent, Henry saw King Peter. He did not recognize him because they had not seen each other for a long time. One of Bertrand's men said 'This is your enemy.' But King Henry asked if it was he and King Peter said twice, 'I am he, I am he.' Then King Henry recognized him and hit him in the face with a knife and they ... fell to the ground. King Henry struck him again and again." Having dispatched his half-brother, Henry left Peter's body unburied for three days, during which time it was subjected to ridicule and abuse.

Legacy and reputation

Popular memory generally views King Peter I as one of the few monarchs who sided with an Islamic sultan (Granada), while also being a Catholic king. Granada paid Pedro I tribute. He helped them during several invasions and a coup. One of the rewards he was given by a sultan of Granada was the famous ruby, a reward for killing an usurper, that is now in the crown of England, brought back by The Black Prince of England along with Peter I's surviving two daughters (Constance and Isabella of Castile, who were legitimized). Not all of Peter's reputation comes from the works of the chronicler Pero López de Ayala, who after his father's change of allegiance had little choice but to serve Peter's usurper. After time passed, there was a reaction in Peter's favour and an alternative name was found for him. It became a fashion to speak of him as El Justiciero, the executor of justice (the Lawful). Apologists were found to say that he had killed only men who would not submit themselves to the law or respect the rights of others. Peter did have his supporters. Even López de Ayala confessed that the king's fall was regretted by many, among them the peasants and burghers subjected to the nobles by late feudal gifts and by the merchants, who enjoyed security under his rule.

The English, who backed Peter, also remembered the king positively. Geoffrey Chaucer visited Castile during Peter's reign and lamented the monarch's death in The Monk's Tale, part of The Canterbury Tales. (Chaucer's patron, John of Gaunt, 1st Duke of Lancaster, had fought on Peter's side in his struggle to reclaim the throne.) The English Lake Poet Robert Southey was presented in 1818 with a copy of a five-act play by the novelist Ann Doherty, entitled Peter the Cruel, King of Castile and Leon.

Peter had many qualities of those later monarchs educated in the centralization style. He built a strong Royal administrative force ahead of his times. He failed to counter or check all the feudal powers that supported his rivals, however illegitimate and opposite to the principles of aristocracy they represented themselves. But his moral superiority was reduced too by the violent means, including fratricides, by which he sought to suppress opposition; he at times was extremely despotic and unpredictable, even by the standards of his age. In this he was preceded by his father Alfonso XI, who since the crisis at the death of Alfonso X had faced multiple rebellions against royal authority.

The death of King Peter ended the traditional alliance of Castile and Navarre with England, which had been started by the Plantagenets to keep France in check. The alliance was later renewed by the Trastámaras and Tudors.

Children
Peter's children by María de Padilla were:
 Beatrice (1353–1369), nun at the Abbey of Santa Clara at Tordesillas
 Constance (1354–1394), married John of Gaunt, 1st Duke of Lancaster
 Isabella (1355–1392), married Edmund of Langley, 1st Duke of York
 Alfonso (1359–1362), Prince of Asturias (Tordesillas, 1359 19 October 1362). Peter forced the Cortes to recognize Alfonso as his legitimate heir on 29 April 1362. However, Alfonso, a very sickly child, died at the age of three, months after his recognition as Crown Prince.

Peter had one son with Juana de Castro, daughter of Pedro Fernández de Castro:
 John (1355–1405), married doña Elvira de Eril, had issue:
 Pedro (died 1461) bishop of Osma and Palencia.

With María de Henestrosa, cousin of María de Padilla:
 Fernando de Castilla (bef. 1361-died young)

With Isabel de Sandoval:
 Sancho de Castilla (1363–1370)
 Diego de Castilla (1365–1440), whose grandson Pedro de Castilla y Fonseca "el mozo" was lover to the queen Joan of Portugal.

With Teresa de Ayala, niece of Pero Lopez de Ayala:
 María de Ayala, who with her mother had long careers at the Dominican convent of Santo Domingo el Real in Toledo and maintained a friendly correspondence with the Trastámaras.

Sources
The great original but hostile authority for the life of Peter the Cruel is the Chronicle of the Chancellor Pedro López de Ayala (1332–1407). To put that in perspective are a biography by Prosper Mérimée, Histoire de Don Pedro I, roi de Castille (1848) and a modern history setting Peter in the social and economic context of his time by Clara Estow (Pedro the Cruel of Castile (1350–1369), 1995).

Strictly speaking, Peter was not defeated by Henry but by the opposing aristocracy; the nobles accomplished their objective of enthroning a weaker dynasty (the House of Trastámara), much more amenable to their interests. Most of the bad stories about Peter are likely to be colored by Black Legend, coined by his enemies, who finally succeeded in their rebellion. The Chancellor López de Ayala, the main source for Peter's reign, was the official chronicler of the Trastámara, a servant of the new rulers and of Peter's aristocratic adversaries.

The change of dynasty can be considered as the epilogue of the first act of a long struggle between the Castilian monarchy and the aristocracy; this struggle was to continue for more than three centuries and come to an end only under Charles I of Spain, the grandson of Ferdinand II of Aragon (Ferdinand V of Castile) and Isabella I of Castile (The Catholic Monarchs), in the first quarter of the 16th century.

See also
 Don Pèdre, roi de Castille, play by Voltaire

Notes

References 
 Estow, Clara (1995), Pedro the Cruel of Castile, 1350-1369, Brill.
 
 
 Leese, Thelma Anna (2007), Blood royal: issue of the kings and queens of medieval England, 1066-1399, Heritage Books
 Gerli, E. Michael; Armistead, Samuel G., eds. (2003). Medieval Iberia: an encyclopedia. Routledge
 Mérimée, Prosper (1849).  The History of Peter the Cruel, King of Castile and Leon. London: R. Bentley
 
 
 Tuchman, Barbara Wertheim (1978), A distant mirror: the calamitous 14th century, Random House

Attribution:

Further reading 

 Bibliography of recent works (in Spanish)
  Santiago Sevilla, "El Rey Don Pedro el Cruel", "King Peter the Cruel", "Peter der Grausame König" a tragedy in Spanish, English, and German versions.

1334 births
1369 deaths
14th-century Castilian monarchs
Peter
Castilian infantes
Burials at Seville Cathedral
14th-century murdered monarchs
1330s births
Sons of kings